The Russian Federation constitutionally consists of 85 federal subjects, 46 of which are oblasts ("provinces"), 9 are krais ("territories"), 22 are republics (one of them, Crimea, is claimed by Ukraine and not recognised internationally as a part of Russia), four are autonomous okrugs ("districts"), and three are the cities of federal significance (Sevastopol has the same international status as Crimea). The Jewish Autonomous Oblast remains the only example of this type, while other AOs had elevated to republican level in early 1990s.

Most of Russias's oblasts and krais take their names from their administrative center; while autonomous entities (republics, autonomous okrugs and autonomous oblast) received their names from the native peoples they was created for by the Soviet government in 1920s–30s.

Oblasts 
All of oblasts′ names in Russian are based on the following model: "name of the central city" (with a few exceptions) + "-skaya" feminine adjective suffix.

Krais

Republics

Autonomous okrugs and oblasts

Federal cities

References 

Russia

Lists of place name etymologies